Synanthedon rubiana is a moth of the family Sesiidae. It is found in southern Greece and Turkey.

The larvae possibly feed on Artemisia species.

References

Moths described in 1998
Sesiidae
Moths of Europe